12 chansons d'avant le déluge is the second album by experimental French singer Brigitte Fontaine, and the first by French rock singer Jacques Higelin, released in 1966 on the Productions Jacques Canetti label. It was their only real release on the label, they would go on to release a few more singles that would be collected on the 15 chansons d'avant le déluge, suite et fin album in 1976, before moving to the Saravah label.

Track listing 

1966 albums
Brigitte Fontaine albums
Jacques Higelin albums